Franco Dal Maso (born March 17, 1942 in Thiene) is a retired Italian professional football player.

References

External links
Profile at Enciclopediadelcalcio.it

1942 births
Living people
Italian footballers
Serie A players
Inter Milan players
U.S. Pistoiese 1921 players
Association football midfielders
People from Thiene
Sportspeople from the Province of Vicenza
Footballers from Veneto